The Roman Catholic Diocese of Kielce is a diocese located in the city of Kielce in the Ecclesiastical province of Kraków in Poland.

Its Cathedral Basilica of the Assumption of the Blessed Virgin Mary in Kielce is listed as a Historic Monument of Poland.

History
 1805: Established as Diocese of Kielce from the Diocese of Kraków
 1818: Suppressed
 December 28, 1882: Restored as Diocese of Kielce

Special churches

Minor Basilicas:
 Bazylika Grobu Bożego, Miechów
 Bazylika Matki Bożej Anielskiej, Dąbrowa Górnicza
 Bazylika Narodzenia Najświętszej Maryi Panny, Wiślica (Basilica of the Birth of the Blessed Virgin Mary)

Bishops
 Bishop Wojciech Górski (1805.06.26 – 1818.02.01)
 Bishop Tomasz Teofil Kuliński (1883.03.15 – 1907.01.08)
 Bishop Augustyn Łosiński (1910.04.26 – 1937.03.03)
 Bishop Czesław Kaczmarek (1938.05.24 – 1963.08.26)
 Bishop Jan Jaroszewicz (1967.03.20 – 1980.04.17)
 Bishop Stanisław Szymecki (1981.03.27 – 1993.05.15), appointed Archbishop of Białystok
 Bishop Kazimierz Ryczan (1993.07.17 – 2014.10.11)
 Bishop Jan Piotrowski (since 2014.10.11)

Auxiliary Bishops
Marian Florczyk (1998-)
Jan Gurda (1972-1993)
Kazimierz Gurda (2004-2014), appointed Bishop of Siedlce
Jan Jaroszewicz (1957-1967), appointed Bishop here
Mieczyslaw Jaworski (1982-2001)
Andrzej Kaleta (2017-)
Tomasz Teofil Kuliński (1872-1883), appointed Bishop here
Edward Henryk Materski (1968-1981), appointed Bishop of Sandomierz
Edward Jan Muszyński (1960-1968)
Piotr Skucha (1986-1992), appointed auxiliary bishop of Sosnowiec
Szczepan (Stefano) Sobalkowski (1957-1958)
Franciszek Sonik (1935-1957)

Other priest of this diocese who became bishop
Henryk Mieczysław Jagodziński, appointed nuncio and titular archbishop in 2020

Reports of Sexual Abuse
In May 2019, a documentary called Tell No One was released featuring a priest identified as Jan A., who served the Diocese in the town Topola, who confessed to molesting young girls. Officials in the Diocese had previously investigated claims made against Jan A. and sent collected evidence to the Vatican in January 2019.

See also
Roman Catholicism in Poland
The Lesser Polish Way

References

Sources

 GCatholic.org
 Catholic Hierarchy
 Diocese website

Roman Catholic dioceses in Poland
Religious organizations established in 1882
Kielce
Roman Catholic dioceses and prelatures established in the 19th century
1805 establishments in the Austrian Empire